Patricia Eileen Kuderer (born 1958) is an American politician and attorney serving as a member of the Washington State Senate for the 48th district. She was appointed to the State Senate after Cyrus Habib was elected lieutenant governor.

Early life and education 
Kuderer was born in Minneapolis. She earned a Bachelor of Arts in history from the University of Minnesota and a Juris Doctor from the William Mitchell College of Law (now the Mitchell Hamline School of Law).

Career 
The King County Council appointed Kuderer to the Washington House of Representatives in 2015, following the resignation of Ross Hunter.

In 2019, Kuderer sponsored a bill to require presidential candidates to release five years of tax returns to qualify for the Washington state primary and general election ballots. Kuderer's bill is similar to legislation proposed in at least 25 other states, which have begun a debate on the Constitutional  authority  for states to make the tax return release a requirement. The bill was signed into law on April 26, 2019.

On January 20, 2020, a complaint was filed by the Washington Asians for Equality and the American Coalition for Equality for Kuderer's use of the phrase "Chinese fire drill" during a committee hearing on January 17. Kuderer had apologized at the January 20 session of the committee, before the complaint was filed.

Kuderer sponsored a bill to prohibit open carry of weapons around the state Capitol and around permitted public demonstrations, that was signed into law on May 12, 2021.

References

External links

Living people
Women state legislators in Washington (state)
William Mitchell College of Law alumni
Democratic Party members of the Washington House of Representatives
Democratic Party Washington (state) state senators
21st-century American politicians
21st-century American women politicians
1958 births